Exit is a magazine that was co-founded in 2000 by editor/photographer Stephen Toner and art director Mark Jubber.

The premier issue of Exit, featuring more than 100 pages of art, fashion and landscape photography, went on to receive industry acclaim.

We publish work that not only represents the true face of photography but also demonstrates how photographers want to be perceived in an industry that rarely affords them the opportunity. (Stephen Toner

Contributors
Photographers who have produced work for Exit include Inez van Lamsweerde and Vinoodh Matadin, Juergen Teller, Terry Richardson, Richard Prince, Klaus Thymann, Philip-Lorca diCorcia, Gregory Crewdson, Paul Graham, Martin Parr, Stephen Shore, William Eggleston and Wim Wenders.

Achievements
At the 2002 Magazine Design Awards, Exit won two awards for Consumer Front Cover of the Year, described by the judges as "bold, minimalist and striking" and Best Use of Photography. Exit went on to win the award for Best Use of Photography again in 2003.

In 2000, Creative Review awarded their Creative Future for Editorial Design to Exit’s art director Mark Jubber.

References

External links
 

2000 establishments in the United Kingdom
Biannual magazines published in the United Kingdom
Fashion magazines published in the United Kingdom
Magazines established in 2000
Photography in the United Kingdom
Photography magazines
Visual arts magazines published in the United Kingdom